The Bank of Bombay was the second of the three presidency banks (others being the Bank of Calcutta and the Bank of Madras) of the Raj period. It was established, pursuant to a charter of the British East India Company, on 15 April 1840.

Subsidiaries 
The bank's headquarters were in Bombay, now called Mumbai. The Bank of Bombay undertook all the normal activities which a commercial bank was expected to undertake. The Bank of Bombay, in the absence of any central banking authority at that time, also conducted certain functions which are ordinarily a preserve of a central bank.

The Bank of Bombay and two other Presidency banks - the Bank of Calcutta and the Bank of Madras - were amalgamated and the reorganized banking entity was named the Imperial Bank of India on 27 January 1921.  The Reserve Bank of India, which is the central banking organization of India, in the year 1955, acquired a controlling interest in the Imperial Bank of India and the Imperial Bank of India was renamed on 30 April 1955 to the State Bank of India.

See also

Indian banking

Further reading

THE EVOLUTION OF THE STATE BANK OF INDIA, Volume 1 — The Roots 1806-1876 by Amiya Kumar Bagchi

References
Note issued by the Bank of Bombay

Banks established in 1840
Banks disestablished in 1921
Banks based in Mumbai
Defunct banks of India
1840 establishments in British India
Defunct companies based in Mumbai
Indian companies established in 1840
1921 disestablishments in India